Don Rogers may refer to:
Don Rogers (footballer) (born 1945), English footballer
Don Rogers (offensive lineman) (born 1936), American football offensive lineman
Don Rogers (politician) (born 1928), American politician in the state of California
Don Rogers (safety) (1962–1986), American football safety